The Chizdia is a right tributary of the river Bega in Romania. It discharges into the Bega near Șanovița.

References

Rivers of Romania
Rivers of Timiș County
Rivers of Arad County